= Mar mine =

Tungsten mine in Yukon, Canada

- Location: Yukon, Canada
- Products: Tungsten

The Mar mine is a large open pit mine located in the western part of Canada in Yukon. Mar represents one of the largest tungsten reserves in Canada having estimated reserves of 5.31 million tonnes of ore grading 0.39% tungsten.
